Dan Iordăchescu (2 June 1930 – 30 August 2015) was a Romanian baritone. A native of Vânju Mare, he was the father of opera singers Cristina Iordachescu, Irina Iordachescu and Raluca Iordachescu. He was active in various countries for a number of years and has received awards.

He is the author of two books of autobiography: "Un drumeț al cântului", Editura Eminescu, București, 1990; and  "Postscriptum la o carte cenzurată".

Notes

External links
 
 

1930 births
2015 deaths
People from Vânju Mare
Romanian operatic baritones
20th-century Romanian male opera singers